Al-Qahira (also known as al-Safa) is a village in northern Syria located in the Ziyarah Subdistrict of the al-Suqaylabiyah District in Hama Governorate. According to the Syria Central Bureau of Statistics (CBS), al-Qahira had a population of 2,947 in the 2004 census. Its inhabitants are predominantly Alawites, including members of the Murshidiyyun sect.

References 

Alawite communities in Syria
Populated places in al-Suqaylabiyah District